Princess Zofia Czartoryska (15 September 1778 – 27 February 1837) was a Polish noblewoman.

Life 
Zofia Czartoryska was born on 15 September, 1778, in Warsaw. She was the fifth child of Countess Izabela Czartoryska née Fleming and her husband Prince Adam Kazimierz Czartoryski, though her father may actually have been Count Franciszek Ksawery Branicki. She ran a salon in Warsaw for Enlightenment era reform leaders of Poland-Lithuania.

Czartoryska was regarded by her contemporaries as a great beauty and sat for numerous portraits. She married Stanisław Kostka Zamoyski on 20 May 1798, in Puławy. She is nicknamed "the mother of the Zamyoski house", as she gave birth to ten children: Konstanty (born in 1799), Andrzej Artur (1800), Jan (1802), Władysław (1803), Celina (1804), Jadwiga (1806), Zdzisław (1810), August (1811), Eliza (1818) and Stanisław (1820).

Czartoryska engaged in charity work and founded a charity organisation in Warsaw called Warszawskie Towarzystwo Dobroczynności. Eight-years-old Frédéric Chopin gave concerts to support the association. She was a recipient of the Order of the Starry Cross.

Czartoryska wrote and published a handbook Rady dla córki ("advice for a daughter") for her daughter Jadwiga, who then went on to marry Leon Sapieha. The book covered such topics as what it means to be a pious woman and a good wife. The latest edition of the book was published in 2002.

To alleviate her ill health, Czartoryska travelled abroad. She died on 27 February, 1837, in Florence., of tuberculosis. She was buried at Santa Croce, her funerary monument was created by sculptor Lorenzo Bartolini.

Gallery

References

1778 births
1837 deaths
Zofia Czartoryska
Polish people of German descent
Zofia
19th-century Polish nobility
Polish salon-holders